Correbia rufescens is a moth of the subfamily Arctiinae. It was described by Rothschild in 1912. It is found in Colombia.

Subspecies
Correbia rufescens rufescens
Correbia rufescens colombiana Zerny, 1931 (Colombia)

Note: Some sources consider Correbia rufescens colombiana a separate species, Correibia colombiana

References

Euchromiina
Moths described in 1912